The 1982 Dartmouth Big Green football team was an American football team that represented Dartmouth College during the 1982 NCAA Division I-AA football season. The Big Green were one of three co-champions of the Ivy League.

In its fifth season under head coach Joe Yukica, the team compiled a 5–5 record but was outscored 235 to 219. Sean Mahler and David Neslund were the team captains.

The Big Green's 5–2 conference record put them in a three-way tie atop the Ivy League standings. Dartmouth outscored Ivy opponents 170 to 145. Dartmouth had beaten both of its co-champions, Harvard and Penn, in head-to-head matchups.

This was Dartmouth's first year in Division I-AA, after having competed in the top-level Division I-A and its predecessors since 1881.

Dartmouth played its home games at Memorial Field on the college campus in Hanover, New Hampshire.

Schedule

References

Dartmouth
Dartmouth Big Green football seasons
Ivy League football champion seasons
Dartmouth Big Green football